Marcos Dajczer (born 19 November 1948, in Buenos Aires) is an Argentine-born Brazilian mathematician whose research concerns geometry and topology.

Dajczer obtained his Ph.D. from the Instituto Nacional de Matemática Pura e Aplicada in 1980 under the supervision of Manfredo do Carmo.

In 2006, he received Brazil's National Order of Scientific Merit honour for his work in mathematics. He was a Guggenheim Fellow in 1985.

Do Carmo–Dajczer theorem is named after his teacher and him.

Selected publications
do Carmo, M. ; Dajczer, M. (1983) . "Rotation hypersurfaces in spaces of constant curvature", Transactions of the American Mathematical Society, Volume 277, Number 2, pp. 685–709.
do Carmo, M. ; Dajczer, M. (1982) . "Helicoidal surfaces with constant mean curvature", Tohoku Mathematical Journal Second Series, Volume 34, Number 3, pp. 425–435.
 Submanifolds and Isometric Immersions (1990, Mathematics Lecture Series)

References

External links

1948 births
Brazilian mathematicians
People from Buenos Aires
Differential geometers
Topologists
Living people
Instituto Nacional de Matemática Pura e Aplicada alumni
Instituto Nacional de Matemática Pura e Aplicada researchers